Ganesh Ghosh (22 June 1900 – 16 October 1994) was an Indian independence activist, revolutionary and politician.

Biography
Ganesh Ghosh born in a Kayastha family which hailed from Chittagong, now in Bangladesh. In 1922, he took admission in the Bengal Technical Institute in Calcutta. Later, he became a member of the Chittagong Jugantar party. He participated in the Chittagong armoury raid, along with Surya Sen and other revolutionaries on 18 April 1930. He fled from Chittagong and took shelter in Chandannagar, Hooghly. After few days police commissioner Charles Tegart attacked the safe house of them in Chandannagar and arrested him. One young fellow revolutionary Jiban Ghoshal Alias Makhan was killed by the police at time of arrest operation.

After the trial, Ganesh Ghosh was deported to the Cellular Jail in Port Blair in 1932. After the release from jail in 1946, he joined communist politics and became a member of the Communist Party of India. After the independence, he became a leader of the party.  After the split in Communist Party of India in 1964, Ganesh sided with the Communist Party of India (Marxist). He was elected to the West Bengal Legislative Assembly in 1952, 1957 and 1962 as a Communist Party of India candidate from Belgachia. He was elected to the 4th Lok Sabha in 1967 from Calcutta South Lok Sabha constituency as a Communist Party of India (Marxist) candidate. In the 1971 Lok Sabha he was again the Communist Party of India (Marxist) candidate from Calcutta South Lok Sabha constituency. This time he was defeated by 26-year-old Priya Ranjan Dash Munshi who won his first Lok Sabha election, fighting on the Congress (R) ticket.

References

External links
Muktadhara article

Revolutionary movement for Indian independence
Indian revolutionaries
Indian independence armed struggle activists
Anti-British establishment revolutionaries from East Bengal
Indian independence activists from Bengal
1994 deaths
Communist Party of India (Marxist) politicians from West Bengal
1900 births
India MPs 1967–1970
Lok Sabha members from West Bengal
Members of the West Bengal Legislative Assembly
People from Chittagong
People from Kolkata district